Javorje is a village in the municipality of Vlasotince, Serbia. According to the 2011 census, the village is populated by one person.

Population

References

Populated places in Jablanica District